Ayr United Football Academy is incorporated as a not for profit Company Limited by guarantee. Its members are Ayr United Football Club, The Ayr United Community Initiative (The Honest Men Trust), NHS Ayrshire and Arran (Community Health Partnership), Ayrshire College and South Ayrshire Council, each of which is represented by a board director. In addition there are three independent directors and an independent chairperson.

Directors

Players

Under 18's squad
<onlyinclude>
As of 01 July 2022

Staff

List of academy graduates
Below is a list of players that have come through the club's academy set-up who made a competitive first-team appearance for Ayr United F.C. since 2006 to the present day.

Players in bold are currently at the club or out on loan.

Notes 
1.Made his debut at the age of 28 having left in 2008 without making an appearance.

References

Football academies in Scotland
Youth football in Scotland
Ayr United F.C.